Iridescence (also known as goniochromism) is the phenomenon of certain surfaces that appear to gradually change color as the angle of view or the angle of illumination changes. Examples of iridescence include soap bubbles, feathers, butterfly wings and seashell nacre, and minerals such as opal. It is a kind of structural coloration that is due to wave interference of light in microstructures or thin films.

Pearlescence is a related effect where some or most of the reflected light is white. The term pearlescent is used to describe certain paint finishes, usually in the automotive industry, which actually produce iridescent effects.

Etymology 
The word iridescence is derived in part from the Greek word ἶρις îris (gen. ἴριδος íridos), meaning rainbow, and is combined with the Latin suffix -escent, meaning "having a tendency toward". Iris in turn derives from the goddess Iris of Greek mythology, who is the personification of the rainbow and acted as a messenger of the gods. Goniochromism is derived from the Greek words gonia, meaning "angle", and chroma, meaning "colour".

Mechanisms 

Iridescence is an optical phenomenon of surfaces in which hue changes with the angle of observation and the angle of illumination. It is often caused by multiple reflections from two or more semi-transparent surfaces in which phase shift and interference of the reflections modulates the incidental light (by amplifying or attenuating some frequencies more than others). The thickness of the layers of the material determines the interference pattern. Iridescence can for example be due to thin-film interference, the functional analogue of selective wavelength attenuation as seen with the Fabry–Pérot interferometer, and can be seen in oil films on water and soap bubbles. Iridescence is also found in plants, animals and many other items. The range of colours of natural iridescent objects can be narrow, for example shifting between two or three colours as the viewing angle changes,

Iridescence can also be created by diffraction. This is found in items like CDs, DVDs, some types of prisms, or cloud iridescence. In the case of diffraction, the entire rainbow of colours will typically be observed as the viewing angle changes. In biology, this type of iridescence results from the formation of diffraction gratings on the surface, such as the long rows of cells in striated muscle, or the specialized abdominal scales of peacock spider Maratus robinsoni and M. chrysomelas. Some types of flower petals can also generate a diffraction grating, but the iridescence is not visible to humans and flower-visiting insects as the diffraction signal is masked by the coloration due to plant pigments.

In biological (and biomimetic) uses, colours produced other than with pigments or dyes are called structural coloration. Microstructures, often multilayered, are used to produce bright but sometimes non-iridescent colours: quite elaborate arrangements are needed to avoid reflecting different colours in different directions. Structural coloration has been understood in general terms since Robert Hooke's 1665 book Micrographia, where Hooke correctly noted that since the iridescence of a peacock's feather was lost when it was plunged into water, but reappeared when it was returned to the air, pigments could not be responsible. It was later found that iridescence in the peacock is due to a complex photonic crystal.

Pearlescence 

Pearlescence is an effect related to iridescence and has a similar cause. Structures within a surface cause light to be reflected back, but in the case of pearlescence some or most of the light is white, giving the object a pearl-like luster. Artificial pigments and paints showing an iridescent effect are often described as pearlescent, for example when used for car paints.

Examples

Life

Invertebrates 
Eledone moschata has a bluish iridescence running along its body and tentacles.

Vertebrates 
The feathers of birds such as kingfishers, birds-of-paradise, hummingbirds, parrots, starlings, grackles, ducks, and peacocks are iridescent. The lateral line on the neon tetra is also iridescent. A single iridescent species of gecko, Cnemaspis kolhapurensis, was identified in India in 2009. The tapetum lucidum, present in the eyes of many vertebrates, is also iridescent. Iridescence is known to be present among non-avian dinosaurs such as dromaeosaurids, enantiornithes, and lithornithids.

Plants 
Many groups of plants have developed iridescence as an adaptation to use more light in dark environments such as the lower levels of tropical forests. The leaves of Southeast Asia's Begonia pavonina, or peacock begonia, appear iridescent azure to human observers due to each leaf's thinly layered photosynthetic structures called iridoplasts that absorb and bend light much like a film of oil over water. Iridescences based on multiple layers of cells are also found in the lycophyte Selaginella and several species of ferns.

Non-Biological

Minerals

Meteorological

Man-made 

Nanocellulose is sometimes iridescent, as are thin films of gasoline and some other hydrocarbons and alcohols when floating on water.

To create jewelry with crystal glass that lets light refract in a rainbow spectrum, Swarovski coats some of its products with special metallic chemical coatings. For example, its Aurora Borealis gives the surface a rainbow appearance. Optically variable ink uses finely powdered iridescent glitter.

See also 

 Anisotropy
 Bioluminescence, irrespective of angle
 Dichroic filter
 Dichroism
 Iridocyte
 Labradorescence (Adularescence)
 Metallic color
 Opalescence
 Structural color
 Thin-film optics
 Nacre
 Opal

References

External links 

 A 2.2 MB GIF animation of a morpho butterfly showing iridescence
 "Article on butterfly iridescence" 

Optics
Optical phenomena
Color